Sven Bergström (born 1951) is a Swedish Centre Party politician who served in the Riksdag from 1997 until 2010.

References

1951 births
20th-century Swedish politicians
21st-century Swedish politicians
Living people
Members of the Riksdag 1994–1998
Members of the Riksdag 1998–2002
Members of the Riksdag 2002–2006
Members of the Riksdag 2006–2010
Members of the Riksdag from the Centre Party (Sweden)